Jack J. Ading (born 1 September 1960 is a Marshallese politician who served as a member of the cabinet, and as a member of  Nitijela. 

He has a degree in accounting from Hawaii Pacific University.

He worked as an accountant from 1981 to 2006. Since 2007 he has been elected as senator for the constituency of Enewetak and Ujelang Atoll in Nitijela. Ading was the Minister of Finance of the Marshall Islands from 2008 to 2012, and from 2014 to 2016. 

He served as the Minister of Justice from 2018 to 2020 and was reappointed in 2022.

References

1960 births
Living people
Finance ministers of the Marshall Islands
Justice ministers of the Marshall Islands
Members of the Legislature of the Marshall Islands
Hawaii Pacific University alumni